The Punta Leynir  (Pointe du Leynir in French) is a 3,238 metres high mountain belonging to the Italian side of Graian Alps.

Toponymy 
The name Leynir should come from Lago Nero (Black Lake), referring to the color of a small lake located SE of the mountain. The name Punta del Leynir was adopted by the old maps of IGM. Giovanni Bobba and Luigi Vaccarone in their Guida delle Alpi Occidentali (Guide book to Western Alps) named the mountain Punta Vaudaletta, while in the technical map of Regione Autonoma Valle d'Aosta its name is Pointe du Leynir.

Geography

The mountain is located on the border between Piedmont and Aosta Valley and its summit is the tripoint where Valle dell'Orco meets the Valsavarenche and the Val di Rhêmes, both tributaries of Dora Baltea. The Col Leynir (Leynir Pass, 3,084 m, NE of the summit) divides the mountain from the Mont Tout Blanc, while the Orco/Valsavarenche ridge continues towards SW with Col Rosset (3,023 m) and Punta Rosset (3,100 m). From the Punta Leynir originates the Orco/Val di Rhêmes ridge, heading SE. After a saddle at 3,112 m it rises to the neighbouring Punta Bes (3,177 m) and then it goes down reaching the Colle del Nivolet. The summit of Punta Leynir is flanked from SW by a subsummit, divided from the main summit by a 350-m stretch of ridge, not difficult to traverse. The mountain, due to its location, offers a very good view on the nearby massif of Gran Paradiso.

SOIUSA classification 
According to SOIUSA (International Standardized Mountain Subdivision of the Alps) the mountain can be classified in the following way:
 main part = Western Alps
 major sector = North Western Alps
 section = Graian Alps
 subsection = Central Graian Alps
 supergroup = Catena Grande Sassière-Tsanteleina
 group = Costiera Galisia-Entrelor-Bioula
 code = I/B-7.III-A.1

Access to the summit 
The mountain can be accessed from Nivolet Pass (2.641 m); this route requires a good hiking experience. Along with Punta Leynir some hikers also climb the nearby Punta Bes. For ski mountaineers, who also usually start from Colle del Nivolet, the level of difficulty is considered BS (Good Skiers).

Mountain huts 
 Refuge città di Chivasso (2,604 m).
 Rifugio Albergo Savoia (2,534 m).

Nature protection 
Punta Leynir belongs to the Parco Nazionale del Gran Paradiso.

Maps
 Istituto Geografico Militare (IGM) official maps of Italy, 1:25.000 and 1:100.000 scale, on-line version
 Carta dei sentieri e dei rifugi scala 1:50.000 n. 3 Il Parco Nazionale del Gran Paradiso, Istituto Geografico Centrale - Torino

External links

References

Leynir
Leynir
Leynir
Mountains of the Graian Alps